AIB Group (UK) p.l.c. is a subsidiary of Allied Irish Banks. It is registered in Northern Ireland. Regulated by the Financial Services Authority, it serves as the legal entity for the United Kingdom banking division of the group.

It trades under two names:

 Allied Irish Bank (GB) in Great Britain, where it is primarily a business bank.
 AIB (NI) in Northern Ireland, where it offers a full range of banking services, both to business and residential customers.

References

Banks of Northern Ireland